Ereatara Enari (born 30 May 1997) is a New Zealand rugby union player, who currently plays as a halfback for  in New Zealand's domestic National Provincial Championship competition and for  in Super Rugby.

Early career

Enari was born in Auckland, but grew up in Gisborne and Palmerston North. He attended Tū Toa until his last year of school moving to Saint Kentigern College in Auckland. After school, he moved to New Zealand's South Island to attend Lincoln University where he played Hawkins Cup rugby and won the championship in 2015, 2016 and 2017.  During this time he also attended the  Academy.

Senior career

Enari was first named in the Canterbury squad ahead of the 2016 Mitre 10 Cup.  Initially, he was expected to be 3rd choice halfback for the defending champions, however, season-ending injuries to first-choice Mitchell Drummond and his replacement Alby Mathewson saw Enari thrust into the starting number 9 jersey at 19 years old.  He made 9 appearances, 7 of them from the start, as Canterbury retained their Mitre 10 Cup Premiership title which was their eighth success in nine seasons. On a pre-season training contract with the Crusaders in preparation for the NZ U20’s tour in 2017, Enari made his Super Rugby debut in a round 1 victory against the Brumbies. He went on to play another 8 games between 2018-2020.

On 15 October 2021, Moana Pasifika announced via its social media accounts that the new Super Rugby franchise had signed Enari for the 2022 Super Rugby Pacific season.

International

Enari was a New Zealand Schoolboys representative in 2014 and also turned out for New Zealand Universities in 2015 touring Japan.  He was involved with the New Zealand Under 20 team in 2016 where he worked with his future Canterbury head coach, Scott Robertson Missing out on World Cup selection in 2016, Enari became Vice Captain in 2017 and was a part of one of the most dominant Junior World Cup victories in decades. Unbeaten in the tournament and winning the final against England 64-17.

On 2 June 2022, Enari – who is of Samoan and Māori descent – was named in the Manu Samoa squad for the first time. He made his international debut for Samoa on 2 July 2022 against Australia A in their first game of the 2022 Pacific Nations Cup, which they won 31–26.

References

External links 
 

1997 births
Living people
Rugby union players from Auckland
People educated at Saint Kentigern College
New Zealand sportspeople of Samoan descent
New Zealand rugby union players
Samoan rugby union players
Samoa international rugby union players
Rugby union scrum-halves
Canterbury rugby union players
Crusaders (rugby union) players
Hawke's Bay rugby union players
Moana Pasifika players